Tommy Thomas may refer to:

 Tommy Thomas (barrister) (born 1952), Malaysian barrister, Attorney General of Malaysia
 Tommy Thomas (pitcher) (Alphonse Thomas, 1899–1988), major league pitcher from 1926–1937
 Tommy Thomas (baseball coach), long-time college baseball coach
 Tommy Thomas (politician) (1899–1980), Canadian politician
 Tommy Thomas (sheriff), former Republican sheriff of Harris County, Texas
 Harry Thomas Jr. (born 1960), nicknamed Tommy, city council member in Washington, D.C.

See also 
 Thomas Thomas (disambiguation)
 Tom Thomas (disambiguation)